USS Halyburton (FFG-40), an , is a ship of the United States Navy named for Pharmacist's Mate Second Class William D. Halyburton Jr. (1924–1945). Halyburton was posthumously awarded the Medal of Honor for his heroism while serving with the 5th Marines, during the Battle of Okinawa in 1945.

Construction
Halyburton was laid down on September 26, 1980 by the Todd Pacific Shipyards Co., Seattle Division, Seattle, Washington; launched on October 13, 1981, sponsored by  Mrs. William David Halyburton Sr., mother of PhM2 Halyburton; and commissioned on January 7, 1984, Commander Robert K. Peters in command.

Operations

Over its commissioned service, Halyburton earned numerous Battle 'E' awards for combat readiness.

Maersk Alabama incident

On April 8, 2009, Somalian pirates captured U.S.-flagged motor vessel  and her 22 crewmembers, 300 miles from the Somali coast. The crew recaptured their ship along with one of the pirates, but the three surviving pirates held the vessel’s master, Capt. Richard Phillips, hostage on a lifeboat. Halyburton was part of a U.S. Navy rescue mission, along with amphibious assault ship , guided missile destroyer , off the Horn of Africa. A ScanEagle unmanned aircraft system provided timely intelligence during the confrontation. U.S. Navy SEALs, on board Bainbridge, brought the standoff to an end by simultaneously shooting and killing all three pirates in the lifeboat, then being towed by Bainbridge, and rescued Phillips on April 12. The fourth pirate was on board  at the time of the shooting, negotiating the hostage's release, and was taken into custody.

Constable's Dues ritual
On July 16, 2009, Halyburton visited the Port of London, mooring in South Dock, West India Quay for three nights. On Saturday July 18, she became the first non-British ship to take part in the Tower of London's Constable's Dues ritual. Dating back to the 14th century, the ceremony involved the crew being challenged for entry into the British capital, mirroring an ancient custom in which a ship had to unload some of its cargo for the sovereign to enter the city. Commander Michael P Huck and Ship's Officer, Lieutenant Commander Tony Mortimer led the crew to the Tower's West Gate, where after being challenged for entry by the Yeoman Gaoler armed with his axe, they were marched to Tower Green accompanied by Yeoman Warders, where they delivered a keg of Castillo Silver Rum, representing the dues, to the Tower's Constable, Sir Roger Wheeler.

2014
Halyburton departed her homeport of Naval Station Mayport in January 2014, for her final deployment. She was scheduled to be decommissioned in late 2014.

On February 6, 2014, a Panamanian helicopter crashed while working with Halyburton on illicit trafficking operations. The Bell 412 helicopter had nine people aboard, one of whom died in the crash.

Halyburton was ceremonially decommissioned on September 6, 2014, at Naval Station Mayport. Halyburton was formally decommissioned and struck from the Naval Vessel Register, September 8, 2014. Ex-Halyburton was listed as being berthed at the Naval Inactive Ship Maintenance Facility, Philadelphia, Pennsylvania. For a time it was thought that she might be transferred to the Turkish Navy in 2015. In 2013, a bill to transfer Halyburton to Turkey in 2015 passed the US House of Representatives. However, the Senate did not take action on the bill and it did not become law.

Museum plans
Plans are currently underway to tow the decommissioned frigate to Erie, Pennsylvania and moor her permanently as a floating museum at one of several possible locations, notably an as-yet undeveloped section of Presque Isle Bay. The location is significant to ships of the Perry class as, historically, it was their namesake Oliver Hazard Perry who won the Battle of Lake Erie during the War of 1812. The future of this effort is far from certain, however fundraising is ongoing and the application process, begun in 2020, is underway.

References

External links

USS Halyburton official website

USS Halyburton command histories at the Naval History & Heritage Command

 

1981 ships
Oliver Hazard Perry-class frigates of the United States Navy
Ships built in Seattle
Gulf War ships of the United States